The 52nd United States Congress was a meeting of the legislative branch of the United States federal government, consisting of the United States Senate and the United States House of Representatives. It met in Washington, D.C., from March 4, 1891, to March 4, 1893, during the final two years of Benjamin Harrison's presidency.

The apportionment of seats in the House of Representatives was based on the 1880 United States census.

The Republicans maintained a majority in the Senate (albeit reduced), but the Democrats won back the majority in the House, ending the Republican overall federal government trifecta.

Major events

Major legislation

 May 5, 1892: Geary Act
 February 13, 1893: Harter Act (Carriage of Goods by Sea), ch. 105,

Party summary
The count below identifies party affiliations at the beginning of the first session of this Congress, and includes members from vacancies and newly admitted states, when they were first seated. Changes resulting from subsequent replacements are shown below in the "Changes in membership" section.

Senate

House of Representatives

Leadership

Senate 
 President: Levi P. Morton (R)
 President pro tempore: Charles F. Manderson (R)
 Republican Conference Chairman: John Sherman
 Democratic Caucus Chairman: Arthur P. Gorman

House of Representatives 
 Speaker: Charles F. Crisp (D)
 Minority Leader: Thomas B. Reed
 Democratic Caucus Chairman: William S. Holman
 Republican Conference Chairman: Thomas J. Henderson
 Democratic Campaign Committee Chairman: Roswell P. Flower

Members
This list is arranged by chamber, then by state. Senators are listed by class, and representatives are listed by district.
Skip to House of Representatives, below

Senate
Senators were elected by the state legislatures every two years, with one-third beginning new six-year terms with each Congress. Senators are listed by Senate class numbers, which indicate the cycle of their election. In this Congress, Class 1 meant their term ended with this Congress, requiring re-election in 1892; Class 2 meant their term began in the last Congress, requiring re-election in 1894; and Class 3 meant their term began in this Congress, requiring re-election in 1896.

Alabama 
 2. John T. Morgan (D)
 3. James L. Pugh (D)

Arkansas 
 2. James H. Berry (D)
 3. James K. Jones (D)

California 
 1. Charles N. Felton (R), from March 19, 1891
 3. Leland Stanford (R)

Colorado 
 2. Edward O. Wolcott (R)
 3. Henry M. Teller (R)

Connecticut 
 1. Joseph R. Hawley (R)
 3. Orville H. Platt (R)

Delaware 
 1. George Gray (D)
 2. Anthony Higgins (R)

Florida 
 1. Samuel Pasco (D)
 3. Wilkinson Call (D), from May 26, 1891

Georgia 
 2. Alfred H. Colquitt (D)
 3. John B. Gordon (D)

Idaho 
 2. George L. Shoup (R)
 3. Fred T. Dubois (R)

Illinois 
 2. Shelby M. Cullom (R)
 3. John McAuley Palmer (D)

Indiana 
 1. David Turpie (D)
 3. Daniel W. Voorhees (D)

Iowa 
 2. James F. Wilson (R)
 3. William B. Allison (R)

Kansas 
 2. Preston B. Plumb (R), until December 20, 1891
 Bishop W. Perkins (R), from January 1, 1892
 3. William A. Peffer (P)

Kentucky 
 2. John G. Carlisle (D), until February 4, 1893
 William Lindsay (D), from February 15, 1893
 3. Joseph C. S. Blackburn (D)

Louisiana 
 2. Randall L. Gibson (D), until December 15, 1892
 Donelson Caffery (D), from December 31, 1892
 3. Edward D. White (D)

Maine 
 1. Eugene Hale (R)
 2. William P. Frye (R)

Maryland 
 1. Arthur Pue Gorman (D)
 3. Charles H. Gibson (D), from November 19, 1891

Massachusetts 
 1. Henry L. Dawes (R)
 2. George F. Hoar (R)

Michigan 
 1. Francis B. Stockbridge (R)
 2. James McMillan (R)

Minnesota 
 1. Cushman K. Davis (R)
 2. William D. Washburn (R)

Mississippi 
 1. James Z. George (D)
 2. Edward C. Walthall (D)

Missouri 
 1. Francis M. Cockrell (D)
 3. George G. Vest (D)

Montana 
 1. Wilbur F. Sanders (R)
 2. Thomas C. Power (R)

Nebraska 
 1. Algernon S. Paddock (R)
 2. Charles F. Manderson (R)

Nevada 
 1. William M. Stewart (R)
 3. John P. Jones (R)

New Hampshire 
 2. William E. Chandler (R)
 3. Jacob H. Gallinger (R)

New Jersey 
 1. Rufus Blodgett (D)
 2. John R. McPherson (D)

New York 
 1. Frank Hiscock (R)
 3. David B. Hill (D), from January 7, 1892

North Carolina 
 2. Matt W. Ransom (D)
 3. Zebulon B. Vance (D)

North Dakota 
 1. Lyman R. Casey (R)
 3. Henry C. Hansbrough (R)

Ohio 
 1. John Sherman (R)
 3. Calvin S. Brice (D)

Oregon 
 2. Joseph N. Dolph (R)
 3. John H. Mitchell (R)

Pennsylvania 
 1. Matthew S. Quay (R)
 3. J. Donald Cameron (R)

Rhode Island 
 1. Nelson W. Aldrich (R)
 2. Nathan F. Dixon III (R)

South Carolina 
 2. Matthew C. Butler (D)
 3. John L. M. Irby (D)

South Dakota 
 2. Richard F. Pettigrew (R)
 3. James H. Kyle (I, later P)

Tennessee 
 1. William B. Bate (D)
 2. Isham G. Harris (D)

Texas 
 1. John H. Reagan (D), until June 10, 1891
 Horace Chilton (D), from June 10, 1891, until March 22, 1892
 Roger Q. Mills (D), from March 23, 1892
 2. Richard Coke (D)

Vermont 
 1. George F. Edmunds (R), until November 1, 1891
 Redfield Proctor (R), from November 2, 1891
 3. Justin S. Morrill (R)

Virginia 
 1. John W. Daniel (D)
 2. John S. Barbour Jr. (D), until May 14, 1892
 Eppa Hunton, II (D), from May 28, 1892

Washington 
 1. John B. Allen (R)
 3. Watson C. Squire (R)

West Virginia 
 1. Charles J. Faulkner (D)
 2. John E. Kenna (D), until January 11, 1893
 Johnson N. Camden (D), from January 25, 1893

Wisconsin 
 1. Philetus Sawyer (R)
 3. William F. Vilas (D)

Wyoming 
 1. Francis E. Warren (R)
 2. Joseph M. Carey (R)

House of Representatives
Members of the House of Representatives are preceded by their district numbers.

Alabama 
 . Richard H. Clarke (D)
 . Hilary A. Herbert (D)
 . William C. Oates (D)
 . Louis W. Turpin (D)
 . James E. Cobb (D)
 . John H. Bankhead (D)
 . William H. Forney (D)
 . Joseph Wheeler (D)

Arkansas 
 . William H. Cate (D)
 . Clifton R. Breckinridge (D)
 . Thomas C. McRae (D)
 . William L. Terry (D)
 . Samuel W. Peel (D)

California 
 . Thomas J. Geary (D)
 . Anthony Caminetti (D)
 . Joseph McKenna (R), until March 28, 1892
 Samuel G. Hilborn (R), from December 5, 1892
 . John T. Cutting (R)
 . Eugene F. Loud (R)
 . William W. Bowers (R)

Colorado 
 . Hosea Townsend (R)

Connecticut 
 . Lewis Sperry (D)
 . Washington F. Willcox (D)
 . Charles A. Russell (R)
 . Robert E. De Forest (D)

Delaware 
 . John W. Causey (D)

Florida 
 . Stephen R. Mallory (D)
 . Robert Bullock (D)

Georgia 
 . Rufus E. Lester (D)
 . Henry G. Turner (D)
 . Charles F. Crisp (D)
 . Charles L. Moses (D)
 . Leonidas F. Livingston (D)
 . James H. Blount (D)
 . Robert W. Everett (D)
 . Thomas G. Lawson (D)
 . Thomas E. Winn (D)
 . Thomas E. Watson (P)

Idaho 
 . Willis Sweet (R)

Illinois 
 . Abner Taylor (R)
 . Lawrence E. McGann (D)
 . Allan C. Durborow Jr. (D)
 . Walter C. Newberry (D)
 . Albert J. Hopkins (R)
 . Robert R. Hitt (R)
 . Thomas J. Henderson (R)
 . Lewis Steward (D)
 . Herman W. Snow (D)
 . Philip S. Post (R)
 . Benjamin T. Cable (D)
 . Scott Wike (D)
 . William M. Springer (D)
 . Owen Scott (D)
 . Samuel T. Busey (D)
 . George W. Fithian (D)
 . Edward Lane (D)
 . William S. Forman (D)
 . James R. Williams (D)
 . George Washington Smith (R)

Indiana 
 . William F. Parrett (D)
 . John L. Bretz (D)
 . Jason B. Brown (D)
 . William S. Holman (D)
 . George W. Cooper (D)
 . Henry U. Johnson (R)
 . William D. Bynum (D)
 . Elijah V. Brookshire (D)
 . Daniel W. Waugh (R)
 . David H. Patton (D)
 . Augustus N. Martin (D)
 . Charles A. O. McClellan (D)
 . Benjamin F. Shively (D)

Iowa 
 . John J. Seerley (D)
 . Walter I. Hayes (D)
 . David B. Henderson (R)
 . Walter H. Butler (D)
 . John T. Hamilton (D)
 . Frederick E. White (D)
 . John A. T. Hull (R)
 . James P. Flick (R)
 . Thomas Bowman (D)
 . Jonathan P. Dolliver (R)
 . George D. Perkins (R)

Kansas 
 . Case Broderick (R)
 . Edward H. Funston (R)
 . Benjamin H. Clover (P)
 . John G. Otis (P)
 . John Davis (P)
 . William Baker (P)
 . Jeremiah Simpson (P)

Kentucky 
 . William J. Stone (D)
 . William T. Ellis (D)
 . Isaac H. Goodnight (D)
 . Alexander B. Montgomery (D)
 . Asher G. Caruth (D)
 . William W. Dickerson (D)
 . William C. P. Breckinridge (D)
 . James B. McCreary (D)
 . Thomas H. Paynter (D)
 . John W. Kendall (D), until March 7, 1892
 Joseph M. Kendall (D), from April 21, 1892
 . John H. Wilson (R)

Louisiana 
 . Adolph Meyer (D)
 . Matthew D. Lagan (D)
 . Andrew Price (D)
 . Newton C. Blanchard (D)
 . Charles J. Boatner (D)
 . Samuel M. Robertson (D)

Maine 
 . Thomas B. Reed (R)
 . Nelson Dingley Jr. (R)
 . Seth L. Milliken (R)
 . Charles A. Boutelle (R)

Maryland 
 . Henry Page (D), until September 3, 1892
 John B. Brown (D), from November 8, 1892
 . Herman Stump (D)
 . Henry W. Rusk (D)
 . Isidor Rayner (D)
 . Barnes Compton (D)
 . William M. McKaig (D)

Massachusetts 
 . Charles S. Randall (R)
 . Elijah A. Morse (R)
 . John F. Andrew (D)
 . Joseph H. O'Neil (D)
 . Sherman Hoar (D)
 . Henry Cabot Lodge (R), until March 3, 1893
 . William Cogswell (R)
 . Moses T. Stevens (D)
 . George F. Williams (D)
 . Joseph H. Walker (R)
 . Frederick S. Coolidge (D)
 . John C. Crosby (D)

Michigan 
 . J. Logan Chipman (D)
 . James S. Gorman (D)
 . James O'Donnell (R)
 . Julius C. Burrows (R)
 . Melbourne H. Ford (D), until April 20, 1891
 Charles E. Belknap (R), from November 3, 1891
 . Byron G. Stout (D)
 . Justin R. Whiting (D)
 . Henry M. Youmans (D)
 . Harrison H. Wheeler (D)
 . Thomas A. E. Weadock (D)
 . Samuel M. Stephenson (R)

Minnesota 
 . William H. Harries (D)
 . John Lind (R)
 . Osee M. Hall (D)
 . James N. Castle (D)
 . Kittel Halvorson (P)

Mississippi 
 . John M. Allen (D)
 . John C. Kyle (D)
 . Thomas C. Catchings (D)
 . Clarke Lewis (D)
 . Joseph H. Beeman (D)
 . Thomas R. Stockdale (D)
 . Charles E. Hooker (D)

Missouri 
 . William H. Hatch (D)
 . Charles H. Mansur (D)
 . Alexander M. Dockery (D)
 . Robert P. C. Wilson (D)
 . John C. Tarsney (D)
 . John T. Heard (D)
 . Richard H. Norton (D)
 . John J. O'Neill (D)
 . Seth W. Cobb (D)
 . Samuel Byrns (D)
 . Richard P. Bland (D)
 . David A. De Armond (D)
 . Robert W. Fyan (D)
 . Marshall Arnold (D)

Montana 
 . William W. Dixon (D)

Nebraska 
 . William J. Bryan (D)
 . William A. McKeighan (P)
 . Omer M. Kem (P)

Nevada 
 . Horace F. Bartine (R)

New Hampshire 
 . Luther F. McKinney (D)
 . Warren F. Daniell (D)

New Jersey 
 . Christopher A. Bergen (R)
 . James Buchanan (R)
 . Jacob A. Geissenhainer (D)
 . Samuel Fowler (D)
 . Cornelius A. Cadmus (D)
 . Thomas D. English (D)
 . Edward F. McDonald (D), until November 5, 1892, vacant thereafter

New York 
 . James W. Covert (D)
 . David A. Boody (D), until October 13, 1891
 Alfred C. Chapin (D), from November 3, 1891, until November 16, 1892, vacant thereafter
 . William J. Coombs (D)
 . John M. Clancy (D)
 . Thomas F. Magner (D)
 . John R. Fellows (D)
 . Edward J. Dunphy (D)
 . Timothy J. Campbell (D)
 . Amos J. Cummings (D)
 . Francis B. Spinola (D), until April 14, 1891
 W. Bourke Cockran (D), from November 3, 1891
 . J. De Witt Warner (D)
 . Roswell P. Flower (D), until September 16, 1891
 Joseph J. Little (D), from November 3, 1891
 . Ashbel P. Fitch (D)
 . William G. Stahlnecker (D)
 . Henry Bacon (D)
 . John H. Ketcham (R)
 . Isaac N. Cox (D)
 . John A. Quackenbush (R)
 . Charles Tracey (D)
 . John Sanford (R)
 . John M. Wever (R)
 . Leslie W. Russell (R), until September 11, 1891
 Newton M. Curtis (R), from November 3, 1891
 . Henry W. Bentley (D)
 . George Van Horn (D)
 . James J. Belden (R)
 . George W. Ray (R)
 . Sereno E. Payne (R)
 . Hosea H. Rockwell (D)
 . John Raines (R)
 . Halbert S. Greenleaf (D)
 . James W. Wadsworth (R)
 . Daniel N. Lockwood (D)
 . Thomas L. Bunting (D)
 . Warren B. Hooker (R)

North Carolina 
 . William A. B. Branch (D)
 . Henry P. Cheatham (R)
 . Benjamin F. Grady (D)
 . Benjamin H. Bunn (D)
 . Archibald H. A. Williams (D)
 . Sydenham B. Alexander (D)
 . John S. Henderson (D)
 . William H. H. Cowles (D)
 . William T. Crawford (D)

North Dakota 
 . Martin N. Johnson (R)

Ohio 
 . Bellamy Storer (R)
 . John A. Caldwell (R)
 . George W. Houk (D)
 . Martin K. Gantz (D)
 . Fernando C. Layton (D)
 . Dennis D. Donovan (D)
 . William E. Haynes (D)
 . Darius D. Hare (D)
 . Joseph H. Outhwaite (D)
 . Robert E. Doan (R)
 . John M. Pattison (D)
 . William H. Enochs (R)
 . J. Irvine Dungan (D)
 . James W. Owens (D)
 . Michael D. Harter (D)
 . John G. Warwick (D), until August 14, 1892
 Lewis P. Ohliger (D), from December 5, 1892
 . Albert J. Pearson (D)
 . Joseph D. Taylor (R)
 . Ezra B. Taylor (R)
 . Vincent A. Taylor (R)
 . Tom L. Johnson (D)

Oregon 
 . Binger Hermann (R)

Pennsylvania 
 . Henry H. Bingham (R)
 . Charles O'Neill (R)
 . William McAleer (D)
 . John E. Reyburn (R)
 . Alfred C. Harmer (R)
 . John B. Robinson (R)
 . Edwin Hallowell (D)
 . William Mutchler (D)
 . David B. Brunner (D)
 . Marriott Brosius (R)
 . Lemuel Amerman (D)
 . George W. Shonk (R)
 . James B. Reilly (D)
 . John W. Rife (R)
 . Myron B. Wright (R)
 . Albert C. Hopkins (R)
 . Simon P. Wolverton (D)
 . Louis E. Atkinson (R)
 . Frank E. Beltzhoover (D)
 . Edward Scull (R)
 . George F. Huff (R)
 . John Dalzell (R)
 . William A. Stone (R)
 . Andrew Stewart (R), until February 26, 1892
 Alexander K. Craig (D), from February 26, 1892, until July 29, 1892
 William A. Sipe (D), from December 5, 1892
 . Eugene P. Gillespie (D)
 . Matthew Griswold (R)
 . Charles W. Stone (R)
 . George F. Kribbs (D)

Rhode Island 
 . Oscar Lapham (D)
 . Charles H. Page (D)

South Carolina 
 . William H. Brawley (D)
 . George D. Tillman (D)
 . George Johnstone (D)
 . George W. Shell (D)
 . John J. Hemphill (D)
 . Eli T. Stackhouse (D), until June 14, 1892
 John L. McLaurin (D), from December 5, 1892
 . William Elliott (D)

South Dakota 

Both representatives were elected statewide on a general ticket
 . John R. Gamble (R), until August 14, 1891
 John L. Jolley (R), from December 7, 1891
 . John A. Pickler (R)

Tennessee 
 . Alfred A. Taylor (R)
 . Leonidas C. Houk (R), until May 25, 1891
 John C. Houk (R), from December 7, 1891
 . Henry C. Snodgrass (D)
 . Benton McMillin (D)
 . James D. Richardson (D)
 . Joseph E. Washington (D)
 . Nicholas N. Cox (D)
 . Benjamin A. Enloe (D)
 . Rice A. Pierce (D)
 . Josiah Patterson (D)

Texas 
 . Charles Stewart (D)
 . John B. Long (D)
 . Constantine B. Kilgore (D)
 . David B. Culberson (D)
 . Joseph W. Bailey (D)
 . Joseph Abbott (D)
 . William H. Crain (D)
 . Littleton W. Moore (D)
 . Roger Q. Mills (D), until March 29, 1892
 Edwin Le Roy Antony (D), from June 14, 1892
 . Joseph D. Sayers (D)
 . Samuel W. T. Lanham (D)

Vermont 
 . H. Henry Powers (R)
 . William W. Grout (R)

Virginia 
 . William A. Jones (D)
 . John W. Lawson (D)
 . George D. Wise (D)
 . James F. Epes (D)
 . Posey G. Lester (D)
 . Paul C. Edmunds (D)
 . Charles T. O'Ferrall (D)
 . William H. F. Lee (D), until October 15, 1891
 Elisha E. Meredith (D), from December 9, 1891
 . John A. Buchanan (D)
 . Henry St. George Tucker III (D)

Washington 
 . John L. Wilson (R)

West Virginia 
 . John O. Pendleton (D)
 . William L. Wilson (D)
 . John D. Alderson (D)
 . James Capehart (D)

Wisconsin 
 . Clinton Babbitt (D)
 . Charles Barwig (D)
 . Allen R. Bushnell (D)
 . John L. Mitchell (D), until March 3, 1893
 . George H. Brickner (D)
 . Lucas M. Miller (D)
 . Frank P. Coburn (D)
 . Nils P. Haugen (R)
 . Thomas Lynch (D)

Wyoming 
 . Clarence D. Clark (R)

Non-voting members 
 . Marcus A. Smith (D)
 . Antonio Joseph (D)
 . David A. Harvey (R)
 . John T. Caine (D)

Changes in membership
The count below reflects changes from the beginning of this Congress.

Senate 
 Replacements: 7
 Democratic: no net change
 Republican: no net change
 Liberal Republican: 1 seat net loss
 Deaths: 4
 Resignations: 5
 Interim appointments: 1
Total seats with changes: 10

|-
| California(1)
| Vacant
| style="font-size:80%" | George Hearst died during previous congress.Successor was elected.
|  nowrap | Charles N. Felton (R)
| March 19, 1891

|-
| Maryland(3)
| Vacant
| style="font-size:80%" | Ephraim K. Wilson died during previous congress.Successor was appointed and subsequently elected (January 21, 1892).
|  nowrap | Charles H. Gibson (D)
| November 19, 1891

|-
| New York(3)
| Vacant
| style="font-size:80%" | Chose to finish his term as Governor of New York before being installed as U.S. Senator.
|  nowrap | David B. Hill (D)
| January 17, 1892

|-
| Florida(3)
| Vacant
| style="font-size:80%" |  Legislature had failed to elect.Incumbent was elected late.
|  nowrap | Wilkinson Call (D)
| May 26, 1891

|-
| Texas(1)
|  nowrap | John H. Reagan (D)
| style="font-size:80%" |  Resigned June 10, 1891.Successor was appointed.
|  nowrap | Horace Chilton (D)
| June 10, 1891

|-
| Vermont(1)
|  nowrap | George F. Edmunds (R)
| style="font-size:80%" |  Resigned November 1, 1891.Successor was appointed and subsequently elected (October 19, 1892).
|  nowrap | Redfield Proctor (R)
| November 2, 1891

|-
| Kansas(2)
|  nowrap | Preston B. Plumb (R)
| style="font-size:80%" |  Died December 20, 1891.Successor was appointed.
|  nowrap | Bishop W. Perkins (R)
| January 1, 1892

|-
| Texas(1)
|  nowrap | Horace Chilton (D)
| style="font-size:80%" |  Successor was elected March 22, 1892.
|  nowrap | Roger Q. Mills (D)
| March 29, 1892

|-
| Virginia(2)
|  nowrap | John S. Barbour Jr. (D)
| style="font-size:80%" |  Died May 14, 1892.Successor was appointed and subsequently elected (December 20, 1893).
|  nowrap | Eppa Hunton (D)
| May 28, 1892
|-
| Louisiana(2)
|  nowrap | Randall L. Gibson (D)
| style="font-size:80%" |  Died December 15, 1892.Successor was appointed and subsequently elected (May 23, 1894).
|  nowrap | Donelson Caffery (D)
| December 31, 1892

|-
| West Virginia(2)
|  nowrap | John E. Kenna (D)
| style="font-size:80%" |  Died January 11, 1893.Successor was elected.
|  nowrap | Johnson N. Camden (D)
| January 25, 1893

|-
| Kentucky(2)
|  nowrap | John G. Carlisle (D)
| style="font-size:80%" |  Resigned February 4, 1893, after being appointed United States Secretary of the Treasury.Successor was elected.
|  nowrap | William Lindsay (D)
| February 15, 1893
|}

House of Representatives 
 replacements: 15
 Democratic: 1-seat net loss
 Republican: 1-seat net gain
 Deaths: 10
 Resignations: 8
 Contested election: 1
 Total seats with changes: 18

Committees

Senate

 Additional Accommodations for the Library of Congress (Select) (Chairman: Daniel W. Voorhees; Ranking Member: Nathan F. Dixon)
 Agriculture and Forestry (Chairman: Algernon S. Paddock; Ranking Member: James Z. George)
 Appropriations (Chairman: William B. Allison; Ranking Member: Francis M. Cockrell)
 Armed Strikebreakers (Select)
 Audit and Control the Contingent Expenses of the Senate (Chairman: John P. Jones; Ranking Member: Zebulon B. Vance)
 Canadian Relations (Chairman: John B. Allen; Ranking Member: James L. Pugh)
 Census (Chairman: Eugene Hale; Ranking Member: James H. Berry)
 Cherokee Nation's Complaints of Invasion in their Territory (Select) (Chairman: Bishop W. Perkins; Ranking Member: N/A)
 Civil Service and Retrenchment (Chairman: Edward O. Wolcott; Ranking Member: Edward C. Walthall) 
 Claims (Chairman: John H. Mitchell; Ranking Member: Samuel Pasco)
 Coast Defenses (Chairman: Watson C. Squire; Ranking Member: James H. Berry)
 Commerce (Chairman: William P. Frye; Ranking Member: Isham G. Harris)
 Corporations Organized in the District of Columbia (Select) (Chairman: Arthur P. Gorman; Ranking Member: N/A)
 Distributing Public Revenue Among the States (Select)
 District of Columbia (Chairman: James McMillan; Ranking Member: N/A)
 Education and Labor (Chairman: Joseph M. Carey; Ranking Member: James Z. George)
 Engrossed Bills (Chairman: Francis M. Cockrell; Ranking Member: Francis E. Warren)
 Enrolled Bills (Chairman: Wilbur F. Sanders; Ranking Member: Alfred H. Colquitt)

 Epidemic Diseases (Chairman: Isham G. Harris; Ranking Member: Francis B. Stockbridge)
 Establish a University in the United States (Select) (Chairman: Redfield Proctor; Ranking Member: N/A)
 Examine the Several Branches in the Civil Service (Chairman: Thomas C. Power; Ranking Member: George Gray)
 Failed National Banks (Select) (Chairman: William E. Chandler; Ranking Member: N/A)
 Finance (Chairman: Justin S. Morrill; Ranking Member: Daniel W. Voorhees)
 Fisheries (Chairman: Francis B. Stockbridge; Ranking Member: Rufus Blodgett)
 Five Civilized Tribes of Indians (Select) (Chairman: Matthew C. Butler; Ranking Member: J. Donald Cameron)
 Foreign Relations (Chairman: John Sherman; Ranking Member: John Tyler Morgan)
 Forest Reservations in California (Select) (Chairman: Charles N. Felton)
 Geological Survey (Select) (Chairman: Edward O. Wolcott; Ranking Member: N/A)
 Immigration (Chairman: William E. Chandler; Ranking Member: Daniel W. Voorhees)
 Indian Affairs (Chairman: Henry L. Dawes; Ranking Member: George L. Shoup)
 Interstate Commerce (Chairman: Shelby M. Cullom; Ranking Member: Isham G. Harris)
 Irrigation and Reclamation of Arid Lands (Select) (Chairman: Francis E. Warren; Ranking Member: James K. Jones)
 Judiciary (Chairman: George F. Hoar; Ranking Member: James L. Pugh)
 Library (Chairman: Matthew S. Quay; Ranking Member: Daniel W. Voorhees)
 Manufactures (Chairman: Anthony Higgins; Ranking Member: Rufus Blodgett)
 Military Affairs (Chairman: Joseph R. Hawley; Ranking Member: Francis M. Cockrell)
 Mines and Mining (Chairman: J. Donald Cameron; Ranking Member: William B. Bate)

 Mississippi River and its Tributaries (Select) (Chairman: William D. Washburn; Ranking Member: Edward C. Walthall)
 Naval Affairs (Chairman: J. Donald Cameron; Ranking Member: John R. McPherson)
 Nicaraguan Claims (Select) (Chairman: John Tyler Morgan; Ranking Member: William M. Stewart)
 Organization, Conduct and Expenditures of the Executive Departments (Chairman: Frank Hiscock; Ranking Member: Francis M. Cockrell)
 Patents (Chairman: Nathan F. Dixon; Ranking Member: George Gray)
 Pensions (Chairman: Cushman K. Davis; Ranking Member: David Turpie)
 Post Office and Post Roads (Chairman: Philetus Sawyer; Ranking Member: Alfred H. Colquitt)
 Potomac River Front (Select) (Chairman: John R. McPherson; Ranking Member: Philetus Sawyer)
 Printing (Chairman: Charles F. Manderson; Ranking Member: Arthur P. Gorman)
 Private Land Claims (Chairman: Matt W. Ransom; Ranking Member: Henry M. Teller)
 Privileges and Elections (Chairman: Henry M. Teller; Ranking Member: Zebulon B. Vance)
 Public Buildings and Grounds (Chairman: Leland Stanford; Ranking Member: George G. Vest)
 Public Lands (Chairman: Joseph N. Dolph; Ranking Member: John T. Morgan)
 Quadrocentennial (Select) (Chairman: Richard F. Pettigrew; Ranking Member: Alfred H. Colquitt)
 Railroads (Chairman: Lyman R. Casey; Ranking Member: Joseph Clay Stiles Blackburn)
 Revision of the Laws (Chairman: James F. Wilson; Ranking Member: John W. Daniel)
 Revolutionary Claims (Chairman: Richard Coke; Ranking Member: J. Donald Cameron)
 Rules (Chairman: Nelson W. Aldrich; Ranking Member: Isham G. Harris)
 Tariff Regulation (Select)
 Territories (Chairman: Orville H. Platt; Ranking Member: James K. Jones)
 Transportation and Sale of Meat Products (Select) (Chairman: George G. Vest; Ranking Member: Lyman R. Casey)
 Transportation Routes to the Seaboard (Chairman: John B. Allen; Ranking Member: Randall L. Gibson then James Z. George)
 Whole
 Woman Suffrage (Select) (Chairman: Zebulon B. Vance; Ranking Member: John B. Allen)

House of Representatives

 Accounts (Chairman: Harry Welles Rusk; Ranking Member: Albert J. Pearson)
 Agriculture (Chairman: William H. Hatch; Ranking Member: Charles L. Moses)
 Alcoholic Liquor Traffic (Select)
 Appropriations (Chairman: William S. Holman; Ranking Member: Joseph H. O'Neil)
 Banking and Currency (Chairman: Henry Bacon; Ranking Member: Seth W. Cobb) 
 Claims (Chairman: Benjamin H. Bunn; Ranking Member: Isaac N. Cox)
 Coinage, Weights and Measures (Chairman: Richard P. Bland; Ranking Member: George F. Williams)
 Disposition of Executive Papers (Chairman: William E. Haynes; Ranking Member: Thomas Bowman)
 District of Columbia (Chairman: John J. Hemphill; Ranking Member: Cornelius A. Cadmus)
 Education (Chairman: Benjamin A. Enloe; Ranking Member: Edwin Hallowell)
 Elections (Chairman: Charles T. O'Ferrall; Ranking Member: George Johnstone)
 Enrolled Bills (Chairman: Owen Scott; Ranking Member: John A. Pickler)
 Expenditures in the Agriculture Department (Chairman: Paul C. Edmunds; Ranking Member: Kittel Halvorson)
 Expenditures in the Interior Department (Chairman: James W. Owens; Ranking Member: William W. Grout)
 Expenditures in the Justice Department (Chairman: John M. Allen; Ranking Member: Ezra B. Taylor)
 Expenditures in the Navy Department (Chairman: Charles A.O. McClellan; Ranking Member: George W. Ray)
 Expenditures in the Post Office Department (Chairman: William C. Oates; Ranking Member: James S. Gorman)
 Expenditures in the State Department (Chairman: Rufus E. Lester; Ranking Member: John Sanford)
 Expenditures in the Treasury Department (Chairman: George H. Brickner; Ranking Member: William A. Stone)
 Expenditures in the War Department (Chairman: Alexander B. Montgomery; Ranking Member: Robert R. Hitt)
 Expenditures on Public Buildings (Chairman: Henry M. Youmans; Ranking Member: John H. Ketcham)
 Foreign Affairs (Chairman: James H. Blount; Ranking Member: Isidor Rayner)
 Indian Affairs (Chairman: Samuel W. Peel; Ranking Member: Benjamin H. Clover)
 Interstate and Foreign Commerce (Chairman: George D. Wise; Ranking Member: Asher G. Caruth) 
 Invalid Pensions (Chairman: Augustus N. Martin; Ranking Member: Edward F. McDonald then Walter H. Butler)
 Judiciary (Chairman: David B. Culberson; Ranking Member: Fernando C. Layton) 
 Labor (Chairman: John C. Tarsney; Ranking Member: John W. Causey)
 Levees and Improvements of the Mississippi River (Chairman: Samuel M. Robertson; Ranking Member: William McAleer)
 Manufactures (Chairman: Charles H. Page; Ranking Member: Archibald H.A. Williams)
 Merchant Marine and Fisheries (Chairman: Samuel Fowler; Ranking Member: Herman Stump)
 Mileage (Chairman: James N. Castle; Ranking Member: John A. Caldwell)
 Military Affairs (Chairman: Joseph H. Outhwaite; Ranking Member: Edward F. McDonald then John C. Crosby)
 Militia (Chairman: Edward Lane; Ranking Member: Alexander K. Craig)
 Mines and Mining (Chairman: William H. H. Cowles; Ranking Member: Thomas Bowman)
 Naval Affairs (Chairman: Hilary A. Herbert; Ranking Member: William McAleer)
 Pacific Railroads (Chairman: James B. Reilly; Ranking Member: Frederick S. Coolidge)
 Patents (Chairman: George D. Tillman; Ranking Member: John T. Hamilton)
 Pensions (Chairman: Robert P.C. Wilson; Ranking Member: Charles L. Moses)
 Printing (Chairman: James D. Richardson; Ranking Member: Case Broderick)
 Private Land Claims (Chairman: Ashbel P. Fitch; Ranking Member: William T. Crawford)
 Post Office and Post Roads (Chairman: John S. Henderson; Ranking Member: John C. Crosby)
 Public Buildings and Grounds (Chairman: John H. Bankhead; Ranking Member: John De Witt Warner)
 Public Lands (Chairman: Thomas C. McRae; Ranking Member: Darius D. Hare)
 Railways and Canals (Chairman: Thomas C. Catchings; Ranking Member: Kittel Halvorson)
 Revision of Laws (Chairman: William T. Ellis; Ranking Member: Lemuel Amerman)
 Rivers and Harbors (Chairman: Newton C. Blanchard; Ranking Member: Charles H. Page)
 Rules (Chairman: Charles F. Crisp; Ranking Member: Thomas B. Reed)
 Standards of Official Conduct
 Territories (Chairman: Joseph E. Washington; Ranking Member: Dennis D. Donovan)
 War Claims (Chairman: Frank E. Beltzhoover; Ranking Member: George W. Shell)
 Ways and Means (Chairman: William M. Springer; Ranking Member: Moses T. Stevens)
 Whole

Joint committees

 Conditions of Indian Tribes (Special)
 Disposition of (Useless) Executive Papers
 The Library
 Printing

Caucuses
 Democratic (House)
 Democratic (Senate)

Employees

Legislative branch agency directors
 Architect of the Capitol: Edward Clark
 Librarian of Congress: Ainsworth Rand Spofford 
 Public Printer of the United States: Francis W. Palmer

Senate 
 Chaplain: John G. Butler (Lutheran)
 Secretary: Anson G. McCook
 Librarian: Alonzo M. Church
 Sergeant at Arms: Edward K. Valentine

House of Representatives 
 Clerk: Edward McPherson, until December 8, 1891
 James Kerr, from December 8, 1891
 Clerk at the Speaker's Table: Charles R. Crisp
 Chaplain: William H. Milburn (Methodist)
 Doorkeeper: Charles H. Turner, elected December 8, 1891
 Reading Clerks: John A. Reeve (D) and James C. Broadwell (R)
 Postmaster: James W. Hathaway
 Sergeant at Arms: Adoniram J. Holmes, until December 8, 1891
 Samuel S. Yoder, from December 8, 1891

See also 
 1890 United States elections (elections leading to this Congress)
 1890–91 United States Senate elections
 1890 United States House of Representatives elections
 1891 United States House of Representatives elections
 1892 United States elections (elections during this Congress, leading to the next Congress)
 1892 United States presidential election
 1892–93 United States Senate elections
 1892 United States House of Representatives elections

Notes

References

External links
 Biographical Directory of the U.S. Congress
 U.S. House of Representatives: House History
 U.S. Senate: Statistics and Lists